Hwajeong-myeon, Yeosu(화정면): myeon in Yeosu, South Jeolla Province, South Korea
 Hwajeong-myeon, Uiryeong(화정면): myeon in Uiryeong County, North Gyeongsang Province, South Korea